Jojo Burger Tempest is a double album by the British band Working for a Nuclear Free City. Released in 2010, the album is the band's third album, and the second to be released in the U.S. The album contains one disc of 17 individual songs and one of a single 33-minute suite.

Response

Critical response
Critical response to the album was mixed. Marc Hogan of Pitchfork commented that the album is "a lot to take in, but with its blend of live drumming, textural guitars, skittering electronics, and wistful harmonies, it's worth braving Jojo's, uh, storm". Robert Cooke of Drowned in Sound noted that "the hour-long main section of Jojo Burger Tempest is too hollow to be of much merit". Spin magazine's Jon Young described the music as "hopscotching through styles with fidgety glee".

Track listing

Disc One
 "Do a Stunt" – 2:44
 "Silent Times" – 3:18
 "Autoblue" – 3:30
 "Alphaville" – 4:39
 "Pachinko" – 3:36
 "Faster Daniel Faster" – 3:01
 "A Black Square With Four Yellow Stars" – 2:03
 "Black Rivers" – 3:50
 "Float Bridges" – 3:07
 "The King and June" – 2:06
 "B.A.R.R.Y." – 4:05
 "Little Lenin" – 3:36
 "Inokashira Park" – 2:42
 "Low" – 3:45
 "Burning Drum" – 3:11
 "Brown Owl" - 3:31
 "Buildings" - 2:16

Disc Two
 "The Jojo Burger Tempest" – 33:26

References

2010 albums
Working for a Nuclear Free City albums